Tsunenobu is a masculine Japanese given name.

Possible writings
Tsunenobu can be written using different combinations of kanji characters. Here are some examples: 

常信, "usual, believe"
常伸, "usual, extend"
常延, "usual, extend"
常宣, "usual,announce"
恒信, "always, believe"
恒伸, "always, extend"
恒延, "always, extend"
恒宣, "always, announce"
庸信, "common, believe"
庸伸, "common, extend"
庸延, "common, extend"
庸宣, "common, announce"
毎信, "every, believe"
毎伸, "every, extend"
毎延, "every, extend"

The name can also be written in hiragana つねのぶ or katakana ツネノブ.

Notable people with the name
, Japanese swimmer.
, Japanese painter.
, Japanese nobleman and poet.

Japanese masculine given names